The Sultanate of Arababni (also known as Arbabni or Arabini) was a small Islamic sultanate located in what is now the Arsi Zone of Ethiopia. Founded around the 12th century, it was the smallest and weakest of the Muslim kingdoms described by the Islamic geographers al-Umari and al-Makrizi.

History 
The Sultanate of Arababni was conquered by the Ethiopian Empire and made part of Fatagar. Fatagar, and thus, Arbabni is the region southeast of the modern capital Addis Ababa, essentially corresponding to the modern West Shewa Zone and Arsi Zone. The Oromo migrations led to the region being renamed for the third time to Arsi, after the Arsi Oromo. The Fatagar region, being one of the former independent Muslim states in the region, was a primary target of the jihad of Ahmad ibn Ibrahim al-Ghazi, Imam of the Adal Sultanate. During the reign of Emperor Amda Seyon I, Arbabni was conquered and annexed by Abyssinia and became part of the Fatagar province. Fetegar was occupied by the Oromo people during the Oromo migrations.

References

Former sultanates in the medieval Horn of Africa